Blading can refer to;

 (razor) Blading, In professional wrestling, blading is the practice of cutting oneself to provoke bleeding.
 (roller) Blading, An aggressive form of inline skating also often referred to by participants as rollerblading, blading or rolling and includes a variety of grinds, airs, slides and other advanced skating maneuvers